NS2 may refer to:

Transportation
 Bukit Batok MRT station (station code: NS2), Singapore
 Kinunobebashi Station (station code: NS02), Kawanishi, Hyōgo Prefecture, Japan
 Tetsudō-Hakubutsukan Station (station code: NS02), Ōmiya-ku, Saitama, Japan
 RAF N.S. 2, a British NS class airship
 New Shepard 2, a Blue Origin reusable space launch vehicle booster rocket (booster #2)
 Blue Origin NS-2, a 2015 November 23 Blue Origin suborbital spaceflight mission for the New Shepard

Software
 ns (simulator), version ns-2, computer network simulation software
 Natural Selection 2, a video game
 Netscape Navigator 2, a webbrowser

Other uses
 Antigonish (provincial electoral district), constituency N.S. 02; Nova Scotia, Canada
 Nord Stream 2, a controversial extension to the Nord Stream gas pipeline between Russia and Germany
 Novelty seeking level 2, impulsiveness
 NS2 (HCV), a viral protein in the hepatitis C virus

See also

 NSS (disambiguation)
 NS (disambiguation)
 2 (disambiguation)